Sowada is a surname. Notable people with the surname include:

 Karin Sowada (born 1961), Australian archaeologist and former politician
 Alphonsus Augustus Sowada (1933–2014), American Roman Catholic bishop and cultural anthropologist